The Bristol 403 is a luxury car which was produced from 1953 to 1955 by British manufacturer Bristol Aeroplane Co. (whose car division later became Bristol Cars). The 403 was the third of the eventual five series of Bristols powered by the BMW-derived pushrod straight-six engine. It replaced the Bristol 401 and 402 in 1953 and continued in production for two years.

It retained much the same styling as the 401, but featured many mechanical improvements compared to that model. The acceleration was markedly improved: the 403 could reach  in 13.4 seconds as against 16.4 seconds for the 401.

To cope with this increased power, an anti-roll bar was fitted on the front suspension and improved drum brakes known as "Alfins" (Aluminum finned) were fitted. Early models had them on all wheels, but Bristol thought the car was over-braked and they were thus restricted to the front wheels on later 403s.

The 403 was the last Bristol to feature a BMW-style radiator grille. It is also noteworthy for having two extra headlamps at the side, almost pre-dating the adoption of the four-headlamp layout in larger cars (Bristol themselves adopted it with the 411 in the late 1960s).

References

External links
 Bristol Owners Club, Bristol Type 403 - 2 litre Saloon

403
Sports sedans
Cars introduced in 1953
Rear-wheel-drive vehicles